Shri Jagannatha  is a 1950 Indian Oriya film directed by Chitta Ranjan Mitra.

Story
The story is about Jagannath's existence at Nila Parvata in the form of Nilamadhav.

Cast
 Gopal Chandra Ghosh... Bidyapati
 Gloria Rout... Lalita
 Chapala Nayak... Nila
 Rama Chandra Mania... Bishwabasu

Credits 
Director: Chitta Ranjan Mitra
Producer: Roopa Bharati
Writers: Ashwini Kumar Ghosh
Screenplay: Gopal Chhotray
Music: Ranajit Rai & Balakrishna Dash
Lyrics: Surendra Kumar Das, Krushna Prasad Basu, Nikunja Kishor Das

Songs
"Nila Sindhu Tire Nila Achala"
"Ho, Aja Bane Mausuma"
"Piyasi-re Nira Khoje Khira Debi Muhin"
"Katha-tie Kahun"

References

1950 films
1950s Odia-language films
Indian fantasy films
1950s fantasy films
Indian black-and-white films